A melee weapon, hand weapon or close combat weapon is any handheld weapon used in hand-to-hand combat, i.e. for use within the direct physical reach of the weapon itself, essentially functioning as an additional (and more impactful) extension of the user's limbs.  By contrast, a ranged weapon is any other weapon capable of engaging targets at a distance beyond immediate physical contact.

Etymology
The term melee originates in the 1640s from the French word , which refers to disorganized hand-to-hand combat, a close-quarters battle, a brawl, or a confused fight; especially involving many combatants.

The 1812 tabletop war game Kriegsspiel referred to the hand-combat stage of the game as a melee. Later war games would follow this pattern. From there, gamers would eventually begin to call the weapons used in that stage melee weapons.

Categories 
Melee weapons can be broadly divided into three categories :

 , which cover spears, pikes, lances, and military forks. They typically have a sharp point designed to inflict penetrating trauma, even against heavily armoured opponents, and the length of such weapons gives a range advantage. Certain variants may also hook at enemies to disrupt and disarm them, or pull them from atop horses.
 Edged weapons, which cover swords, daggers, axes, and war scythes. These weapons are designed to cause cutting, dismemberment, and exsanguination injuries, and are most effective against minimally armoured opponents. These are used to cut, hack, slash, thrust or stab.
 Blunt weapons, which cover clubs, maces, war hammers, staves, and flails. These weapons are designed to cause blunt trauma, even through armour that would protect against penetration by pointed or edged weapons.

Many weapons fit into multiple categories, or fit in between them; many polearms such as halberds, lucerne hammers, and  add edged and blunt methods of attack to a spear base, and various hooked weapons such as billhooks, falxes, and  evade simple classification; while flexible weapons such as whips don't fall into any of these categories.

List of melee weapons 

 Bladed weapons
 Knife
 Dagger (see List of daggers)
 Sword (see Types of swords)
 Bayonet
 Scythe
 Kama
 Kukri
 Machete
 Shuriken
 Polearms
 Pike
 Pilum
 Halberd
 Spear
 Guandao
 Bill
 Naginata
 Lance
 Guisarme
 Trident
 Bident
 Blunt weapons
 Club
 Mace
 Police baton
 Stick
 Nunchaku
 Knuckleduster
 Sports equipment (utilized as an improvised or makeshift melee weapon)
 Baseball bat
 Cricket bat
 Golf club
 Pool cue
 Javelin
 Hockey stick
 Boxing gloves
 Tennis racket
 Bowling ball
 Hardware and utility tools utilized as improvised melee weapons (often used for criminal purposes, or depicted in fiction) 
 Entrenching tool (frequently used as a melee weapon in the confines of trench warfare during World War I)
 Rebar
 Pipe
 Pitchfork
 Hammer
 Sledgehammer
 Axe
 Pickaxe
 Sickle
 Chainsaw (commonly in fiction)
 Ice pick
 Shovel 
 Frying pan
 Motorcycle sprocket (notably popular among criminals in Indonesia)
 Crowbar

See also 
 Cold weapon
 Melee (gaming)
 Knife fight
 List of premodern combat weapons
 List of martial arts weapons

References 

 
1980s neologisms